The stony-soil ctenotus (Ctenotus saxatilis)  is a species of skink found in Northern Territory, South Australia, and Western Australia.

References

saxatilis
Reptiles described in 1970
Taxa named by Glen Milton Storr